The Taiping railway station (Jawi: ستيسين کريتاڤي تايڤيڠ)  is a Malaysian train station located at and named after the town of Taiping, Perak.

Malaysia's first railway station was situated in Taiping and was opened in 1885 when the Taiping-Port Weld Railway Line, Malaysia's first, was opened. The current modern station is the third railway station to be built in Taiping. It was built as part of the Ipoh-Padang Besar Electrification and Double-Tracking Project which was completed in 2014.

The station is on the West Coast Line and is a stop for both the KTM ETS services between Gemas and Padang Besar, and between Ipoh and Padang Besar since the two services commenced on 11 July 2015 and 10 July 2015 respectively, as well as the Bukit Mertajam-Padang Rengas route of the  KTM Komuter Northern Sector line.

History

The first Taiping railway station was opened in 1885 and is situated where the King Edward VII Primary School now stands. The station was officiated by Sir Hugh Low. The station was the eastern terminus of the Taiping-Port Weld Railway Line, Malaysia's first railway line. The tracks of the line no longer exist as they were dismantled in the 1980s.

The second station, which replaced the original Taiping railway station, was the relocated to the Jalan Stesen site between the 1890s to early 1900s. This station was in operation until it was replaced by a new station that was built as part of the Ipoh-Padang Besar Electrification and Double-Tracking Project. The old station is still standing and is being preserved.

The new station, which is situated to the northeast of the second station, began operations on 27 February 2014. The KTM ETS's ETS Transit began serving this station when services commenced on 10 July 2015. A day later on 11 July 2015, ETS Ekspres trains began serving this station.

References

External links

 Taiping Railway Station
 Taiping Railway Station at www.keretapi.com

KTM ETS railway stations
Railway stations in Perak
Taiping, Perak